Miranda is a municipality located in the Brazilian state of Mato Grosso do Sul, Brazil, named for its location on the river by the same name. Its population was 28,220 in 2020 and its area is 5,479 km².

References

External links 
Pantanal Escapes - Travel Guide and tourist information for Miranda

Municipalities in Mato Grosso do Sul